The men's 110 metres hurdles event at the 2006 Commonwealth Games was held on March 21.

Medalists

Results

Heats
Qualification: First 2 of each heat (Q) and the next 2 fastest (q) qualified for the final.

Wind:Heat 1: +0.7 m/s, Heat 2: +1.4 m/s, Heat 3: ?

Final
Wind: –1.1 m/s

References
Results

110
2006